Lake Cumberland State Resort Park is a state park located on the northern shore of Lake Cumberland near Jamestown, Kentucky in Russell County.

Attractions
 Lure Lodge
 Rowena Landing Restaurant
 Pumpkin Creek Lodge
 Cottages
 Campground
 Meeting Rooms
 Gift Shop
 Country Store
 State Dock Marina

Recreation
 Boat Launching Ramp
 Swimming
 Frisbee Golf
 Tennis
 Basketball
 Volley Ball
 Playground
 Shuffle Board
 Guided Horse Tours
 Hiking Trails

Events
 New Year's Eve Ball (December 31)
 Buffalo Dinner (January)
 Valentines Buffet
 GeoCaching (April)
 Seafood Buffets
 Easter Buffet
 Mothers Day Buffet (May)
  Fireworks
 Lake Cumberland Raft Up (August)
 Poker Run (September)
 Lake Cumberland Clean Up (September)
 Thanksgiving Buffet

References

External links
Lake Cumberland State Resort Park Kentucky Department of Parks

State parks of Kentucky
Protected areas of Russell County, Kentucky
Cumberland River